The 2008 Dutch Figure Skating Championships took place between 4 and 6 January 2008 in Tilburg. Skaters competed in the disciplines of men's singles and ladies' singles.

Senior results

Men

Ladies

External links
 results

Dutch Figure Skating Championships
Dutch Figure Skating Championships, 2008
2008 in Dutch sport